Tanja Mirjam Cecilia Lorentzon (née Tanja Mirjam Cecilia Koukonen; born 25 September 1971), previously known as Tanja Svedjeström, is a Sweden-Finnish actress and dramatist of Finnish descent. Internationally, she is probably best known for her role of Sonja Modig in The Girl Who Played with Fire and The Girl Who Kicked the Hornets' Nest, film adaptations of the Millennium series by Stieg Larsson.

Early and personal life 
Lorentzon was born in Tumba, Stockholm County, Sweden, to Finnish parents. In her youth, Lorentzon worked as an engineer in the Ericsson, Inc., a cleaner and a teacher before entering the Swedish National Academy of Mime and Acting in 1994. She earned her bachelor's degree in 1998.

Lorentzon currently lives in Stockholm with her husband and their three daughters.

Writing career 
In 2010, Lorentzon debuted as a screenwriter with her monologue play Grandmother's Dark Eyes (Swedish: Mormors mörka ögon), in which she played all three characters — herself, her mother and her grandmother. In December 2010, Grandmother's Dark Eyes was broadcast on the STV. The following year, Lorentzon was awarded with the P7 Sisuradio Award for Swedish Finn of the Year for her work on Grandmother's Dark Eyes.

Filmography

Writing

Awards and nominations

References

External links 
 

1971 births
20th-century Swedish actresses
21st-century Swedish actresses
Living people
People from Tumba, Sweden
Swedish people of Finnish descent
Swedish screenwriters
Swedish women screenwriters